Alexandr Vladimirovich Gaidukov (born 10 January 1974) is a Russia-Kazakhstani water polo player. At the 2004 Summer Olympics, he competed for the Kazakhstan men's national water polo team in the men's event.

Doping allegations
In 2005, a doping test proved positive. Gaidukov was banned for 12 months.

References

External links
 

1974 births
Living people
Sportspeople from Volgograd
Russian male water polo players
Kazakhstani male water polo players
Olympic water polo players of Kazakhstan
Water polo players at the 2004 Summer Olympics
Water polo players at the 2002 Asian Games
Water polo players at the 2006 Asian Games
Water polo players at the 2010 Asian Games
Asian Games gold medalists for Kazakhstan
Asian Games bronze medalists for Kazakhstan
Asian Games medalists in water polo
Medalists at the 2002 Asian Games
Medalists at the 2006 Asian Games
Medalists at the 2010 Asian Games
Russian water polo coaches
Russia women's national water polo team coaches
Water polo coaches at the 2016 Summer Olympics
Water polo coaches at the 2020 Summer Olympics